Pachia is a village in Kamrup, situated on the north bank of the river Brahmaputra .

Transport
Pachia is accessible through National Highway 31. All major private commercial vehicles ply between Pachia and nearby towns.

See also
 Pachim Dhuligaon
 Nizmanakuchi

References

Villages in Kamrup district